Marco Herszel (born 2 June 1979 in Schönebeck, Bezirk Magdeburg) is a German sprint canoeist who competed in the early to mid-2000s. He won four medals at the ICF Canoe Sprint World Championships a gold (K-4 1000 m: 2007), a silver (K-2 1000 m: 2005) and two bronzes (K-2 1000 m: 2001, 2003).

Herszel also finished sixth in the K-2 1000 m event at the 2004 Summer Olympics in Athens.

References

Yahoo! Sports

1979 births
Living people
People from Schönebeck
People from Bezirk Magdeburg
German male canoeists
Sportspeople from Saxony-Anhalt
Olympic canoeists of Germany
Canoeists at the 2004 Summer Olympics
ICF Canoe Sprint World Championships medalists in kayak